Hard Rock Bottom is the sixth studio album by punk rock band No Use for a Name, released on June 16, 2002. The band recorded the album with producer Ryan Greene in January 2002. Song number nine, "This Is a Rebel Song", features Karina Denike from Dance Hall Crashers. A video for "Dumb Reminders" was released and features the band running from angry fans.

Release
On April 3, 2002, the track listing for Hard Rock Bottom was posted online. Hard Rock Bottom was released on June 18, 2002. On the same day, a music video was released for "Dumb Reminders". Between late June and mid-August, the group went on the 2002 edition of Warped Tour. In October and November 2002, No Use for a Name embarked on a headlining US tour, with support from Yellowcard, Slick Shoes, and the Eyeliners. Later in October, the band performed on The Mike Bullard Show and Off the Record with Michael Landsberg. In February and March 2003, the band toured with Sum 41. In September, the band embarked on a tour of Canada, which was followed by a European tour in October and November; both stints with Bigwig and Irish Car Bomb. On April 16, the band appeared on Last Call with Carson Daly.

Track listing
All songs written by Tony Sly, except where noted.
 "Feels Like Home" – 1:04
 "International You Day" – 2:52
 "Pre-Medicated Murder" – 1:58
 "Dumb Reminders" – 2:49
 "Any Number Can Play" – 2:38
 "Friends of the Enemy" – 3:27
 "Angela" – 2:45
 "Let Me Down" – 2:58
 "This Is a Rebel Song" – 2:24 (Sinéad O'Connor cover)
 "Solitaire" – 2:46
 "Undefeated" – 2:54
 "Insecurity Alert" – 3:11
 "Nailed Shut" – 2:41

Personnel
 Tony Sly - vocals and guitar
 Dave Nassie – guitar
 Matt Riddle – bass
 Rory Koff – drums

References

No Use for a Name albums
2002 albums
Fat Wreck Chords albums
Albums produced by Ryan Greene